The 1931 LFF Lyga was the 10th season of the LFF Lyga football competition in Lithuania.  It was contested by 7 teams, and KSS Klaipėda won the championship.

League standings

References
RSSSF

LFF Lyga seasons
Lith
Lith
1